Bensbach may refer to:

Bensbach Airport in Papua New Guinea
Bensbach River in Papua New Guinea
Bensbach's bird-of-paradise